The 2022 Mosquito Fire was a large wildfire that burned in California's Placer and El Dorado counties as the state's largest wildfire of the year. The fire began on September 6, 2022, above Oxbow Reservoir in the Middle Fork American River drainage on the western slope of the Sierra Nevada. The Mosquito Fire went on to burn , destroying 78 structures (and damaging 13 more) in the small, rural communities of Michigan Bluff, Foresthill, and Volcanoville. The fire was declared 100% contained on October 22, more than a month and a half later, though well after the fire's progression had been halted.

During the first week of the fire's spread, more than 11,000 people were placed under evacuation orders and more than 9,000 structures were considered threatened. Officials noted "great potential" for continued fire spread, but fire activity was moderated by an unusually early Pacific storm that brought wetting rains to the area in mid-September, after which the fire grew little and containment steadily increased.

The fire suppression effort cost more than $180 million, and at its peak involved more than 3,700 firefighters under the direction of the Type 1 California Incident Management Team (IMT) 5. Cal Fire, the U.S. Forest Service, Placer and El Dorado counties, and the Foresthill Fire Protection District were all part of the Mosquito Fire's unified command. The cause of the fire has not been established, but the potential role of Pacific Gas & Electric Company (PG&E) equipment is the subject of multiple civil lawsuits and a U.S. Forest Service criminal investigation.

Background factors 
Before and during the early days of the Mosquito Fire's spread, much of California experienced a record-breaking heat wave. Downtown Sacramento, 50 miles to the southwest, recorded its all-time highest temperature of 116 degrees Fahrenheit. UCLA climate scientist Daniel Swain described the heat wave as "the worst September heat wave on record, certainly in Northern California."

In the weeks before the Mosquito Fire began, vegetation moisture levels in the northern Sierra Nevada were already nearing record lows. The heatwave created a "flash drying effect", drying out vegetation even further. That the heat wave occurred unusually late in the summer, when fuels are typically at their driest but after temperatures have usually peaked, exacerbated the flammability of vegetation across the state. On September 2, in advance of the heat wave, the National Interagency Fire Center issued a "Fuels and Fire Behavior Advisory" for most of Northern California, warning of elevated fire weather concerns with "conditions conducive to long range spotting, rapid fire growth, and high resistance to control."

Fire progression

Ignition 
The Mosquito Fire was first reported at approximately 6:27 p.m on September 6, above the northern shore of Oxbow Reservoir near Mosquito Ridge Road (for which it was named). Aircraft were overhead to fight the fire by 6:47 p.m, and they reported that the fire was 4 to 5 acres in size, burning in brush and timber with a moderate rate of spread and some spotting. Steep terrain with tough access hindered the firefight: an old landslide on the road near the fire made it difficult for fire engines to pass, and the fire was burning on the shadowed side of a canyon slope that made it difficult for larger air tankers to drop water or fire retardant on it. Air attack was initially hopeful that ground crews alone could handle the fire once night began to fall and firefighting aircraft were forced to return at roughly 7:41 p.m, less than an hour after arriving on scene.

At around 9:00 p.m, the fire was fanned by outflow winds from nearby thunderstorms, and crews reported being challenged by the gusty winds and a now-moderate rate of spread. As the fire began to spot ahead, evacuations were ordered for Michigan Bluff and surrounding roads. The fire jumped the North Fork of the Middle Fork American River and continued to spread, reaching 100 acres before midnight and producing a smoke plume visible from as far away as Auburn, 20 miles to the southwest. The fire continued to burn actively through the night, moving northwest up the side of the Middle Fork American River canyon.

September 7 

On September 7, the Mosquito Fire grew considerably, developing a massive pyrocumulus cloud and exhibiting "extreme" behavior that made it difficult to directly combat the fire. Several other concurrent wildfires caused Mosquito Fire personnel to compete for limited firefighting resources, such as Very Large Airtankers (VLATs). The Fairview Fire in Southern California's Riverside County was also extremely active throughout the day, and other large fires, including the Fork Fire in Madera County and the Barnes Fire in Modoc County, broke out that day. As the fire burned in all directions, it burned structures in the community of Michigan Bluff.

September 8 
The next day, September 8, saw the single largest day of growth on the Mosquito Fire. The fire was mapped by FIRIS (the Fire Integrated Real-time Intelligence System, using aircraft with infrared sensors) at approximately 13,705 acres. Shortly afterwards, at approximately 1:00 p.m. PDT, the Mosquito Fire spotted across the American River and crossed southward into El Dorado County, burning towards Volcanoville and destroying structures along Volcanoville Road. The fire burned an additional 17,000 acres in just 4 hours. An elderly couple had to be rescued when their vehicle became disabled and a wild pig attacked their dogs, trapping them behind the fire line and necessitating a sortie through the flames by an El Dorado County Sheriff's deputy.

As fire activity intensified and became plume-dominated, the Mosquito Fire produced an enormous pyrocumulonimbus cloud that reached more than  into the atmosphere, visible from as far away as Chico and Sonoma, more than 120 miles away. A NOAA mission flew around the plume in order to conduct research with San Jose State University's Fire Weather Research Laboratory and the University of Nevada, which had researchers on the ground nearby, on fire and atmospheric processes. Radar showed that the pyrocumulonimbus cloud contained updrafts with speeds in excess of 30 meters per second. The Mosquito Fire continued to generate a pyrocumulonimbus cloud after sunset, in what scientists said was an indication of the vast amount of heat the fire was putting out.

During this time, scientists recorded a "very strong fire-generated vortex", both visually and on radar, on the southeast flank of the Mosquito Fire. This cyclonic vortex within the rotating column of smoke was connected to the ground, had a circulation extending up to approximately 10,000 feet, and generated winds that were equivalent in strength to an EF-1 tornado. Fire-generated tornadic vortices are often called fire tornadoes, or, when occurring at a smaller scale, fire whirls. They are not well-understood, but very strong fire-generated tornadic vortices have occurred in multiple California wildfires, including the 2020 Creek Fire, the 2020 Loyalton Fire, and the 2018 Carr Fire.

September 9 onwards 
On September 9, firefighting conditions improved with slightly cooler temperatures and low winds, causing the fire to remain under an inversion of its own smoke. On September 10, those temperatures and higher relative humidities continued to moderate fire behavior, but increasing winds pushed the fire further north and northeast and prompted more evacuations, primarily between the fire and the Sierra crest.

By the morning of September 11, fire crews had achieved 10% containment, primarily on the southwest flanks of the fire in the vicinity of Volcanoville and Quintette. The fire remained active on the 11th, particularly once the inversion lifted again, but did not spread rapidly. Firefighters began to remove trees and brush from old fire lines from the 2013 American Fire and the 2014 King Fire, in anticipation of reusing them as containment lines for the Mosquito Fire. By the evening of September 12, containment rose to 16% as firefighters continued to strengthen containment lines near Foresthill and Volcanoville, on the northern and southern flanks respectively.

On September 13, remaining tropical moisture from the remnants of Hurricane Kay left the area and was replaced by persistent southwest winds. Though firefighters achieved 18% containment by the morning, the winds allowed smoke to clear and the inversion to break, leading to an uptick in fire activity. The entire eastern flank of the fire was highly active, and new evacuation orders were issued for the Stumpy Meadows area. Between 2:00 and 2:30 PM, the fire spotted from the south side of the Middle Fork American River to the north side, below Todd Valley and Foresthill, on the west flank of the fire. The spot fire grew aggressively and became established, creating a large plume as it burned up towards Foresthill, which had been under a mandatory evacuation for several days by that point. Some personnel working on dozer lines in the canyon were forced to abandon their equipment and flee from the rapidly growing fire. Fire crews hastily set backfires between Foresthill Road and the fire to the south in order to consume the fuel between the two and prevent the fire from overrunning the community. A massive airshow attempted to halt the fire, as 16 different aircraft, including all four of the Very Large Air Tankers operated in the United States, aided ground crews. Those tankers also dropped massive amounts of retardant to reinforce the firefighting efforts—just shy of 200,000 gallons on September 13 alone. By that evening, the fire was mapped at approximately 58,000 acres, representing nearly 10,000 acres of growth in a day, with 25% containment.

The fire continued to burn to the east, in steep and inaccessible terrain in canyons upriver from the confluence of the Middle Fork American River, where the North Fork of Middle Fork American River, the Middle Fork American River, and the Rubicon River come together. It burned through much of the footprint of the 2006 Ralston Fire, as well as parts of the burn scars from the 2013 American Fire and the 2014 King Fire.

Beginning on September 18, an unseasonably early Pacific storm brought rain to much of Northern California, including the Sierra and the Mosquito Fire. The fire increased in acreage somewhat on the 17th, fueled by gusty winds ahead of the storm, but the ensuing precipitation tamped down fire activity. This allowed fire crews to finish gaining containment around the fire perimeter on the southern, western, and northern sides, leaving the wide eastern flank as the only remaining open fire front. This effort, along with the storm, allowed several thousand people to return to their homes once evacuation orders were lifted or reduced. Concerns that heavy rain could cause flash flooding and ash/debris flows in the burn scar (burned areas do not slow runoff as well as unburned areas) led to a flash flood watch being issued for the entire Mosquito Fire burn area on September 18 and 19. However, fuels remained critically dry and rain did not reach areas under the canopy. In the meantime, steep and muddy terrain posed new challenges for firefighting. On September 19, for the first time since igniting, the Mosquito Fire did not increase in acreage, although smoking hot spots were still visible during gaps in the rain.

By September 21, all evacuation orders in both Placer and El Dorado counties were lifted. Firefighters struggled to complete the last 5% of containment line, hampered by the extremely difficult terrain of the river canyons, but ultimately declared the fire 100% contained on October 22, 46 days after it began. The fire was officially declared controlled on November 10.

Impacts

Casualties 
No deaths were reported as a result of the Mosquito Fire, but at least two firefighter injuries were noted; one firefighter hurt their wrist in a fall, another was injured when they stepped into a still-burning stump hole and sustained second-degree burns on their leg.

Damage 
At least 78 structures were destroyed and 13 damaged; on September 7, the fire burned in the area of Michigan Bluff, on September 8 the Mosquito Fire impacted structures near Volcanoville and Quintette, and on September 13 the fire impacted structures in Foresthill. Official maps of the damage assessments in both counties are available online. Local and regional infrastructure was also affected: the Georgetown Divide Public Utility District declared a local emergency due to fire impacts to its water service infrastructure, including damaged canals and flumes. The Placer County Water Agency, which operates the Middle Fork Project (a system of water supply and hydroelectric power generation facilities on the Middle Fork American River that constitutes California's eight-largest public power project), sued PG&E after alleging that the fire had caused, in addition to physical damage to its facilities and erosion/debris mitigation, the loss of tens of millions of dollars in power production sales.

Also threatened was the Placer County Big Trees Grove of giant sequoias, which is a small grove with only six old growth trees that marks the northernmost and most isolated giant sequoia grove in California. The U.S. Forest Service conducted defensive burning operations and cleared fuel around the grove while treating the trees with water, seeking to minimize high-severity fire effects should the Mosquito Fire have impacted it. The fire was eventually stopped four miles from the grove.

Closures and evacuations 
The Mosquito Fire caused evacuation warnings and orders for many communities in Placer County and El Dorado County. During the first week of the fire, more than 11,000 people were forced to evacuate. That number included residents of Michigan Bluff, Foresthill, and Todd Valley in Placer County, and Volcanoville and Georgetown in El Dorado County.  At least 8 people were arrested in evacuation areas for crimes "against evacuated properties," 1 person in Placer County and 7 in El Dorado County. One person arrested for burglary posed as a PG&E contractor in order to get past law enforcement checkpoints. 

A large portion of the Tahoe National Forest was also subject to a closure order, and recreation areas such as the French Meadows Reservoir and the Western States Endurance Run trail (parts of which have burned) are expected to be closed at least through the end of 2022. An area representing approximately 20 miles of the Western States Endurance Run route burned. The Rubicon Trail (a popular 4x4 road/trail) was also closed.

Environmental impacts

Smoke and air quality impacts 
The fire routinely led to hazardous air qualities in many nearby regions in Northern California and Nevada, including the Lake Tahoe Basin and the cities of Folsom and Auburn. Air quality indices of more than 1,000 were recorded in the Sierra foothills south of Interstate 80, near the fire. Some events, such as the Great Reno Balloon Race, were affected by the haze. On at least one day, schools throughout Washoe County were forced to close as local health officials declared an air quality emergency. Major businesses and facilities, such as the Tesla, Inc.Gigafactory near Sparks, adjusted their HVAC systems and provided N-95 respirator masks. Smoke from the Mosquito Fire and other Western wildfires traveled as far as the East Coast, visible on satellite images. Researchers with the University of California, Davis Tahoe Environmental Research Center conducted on the effects that smoke particulates from the Mosquito Fire may have had on Lake Tahoe, using a robotic underwater glider first deployed when the Caldor Fire burned towards the region in the summer of 2021.

Blodgett Forest Research Station 
The Mosquito Fire burned through parts of the Blodgett Forest Research Station, owned by the University of California, Berkeley. No structures were impacted. Of the 4,356-acre property, the wildfire burned roughly 700 acres. A recently donated parcel of 400 acres burned at high severity, with close to 100% vegetation mortality. According to a Berkeley ecologist, the ~250 acres treated with prescribed fire and other methods saw more moderate fire behavior when the Mosquito Fire passed through them compared to areas that had not been treated.

Watershed impacts 
The Mosquito Fire also burned large parts of multiple river watersheds that empty into Oxbow Reservoir and the Middle Fork American River, which ultimately provide drinking water to many nearby communities in the Central Valley and Sierra foothills. The Placer County Water Agency added extra water treatment steps to remove sediment, ash, and debris that may continue to enter waterways for years to come. During early winter storms after the fire, Cal Fire monitored the burn area for erosion and debris flows while performing mitigation work.

Soil burn impacts 
The Forest Service conducted its regular post-fire analysis of the burned area, concluding that about 66% of the fire footprint had a low or very low soil burn severity, 25% had a moderate soil burn severity, and 9% of the fire footprint had a high soil burn severity. High soil burn severity areas are more prone to increased runoff rates and erosion, creating higher probabilities for downstream flooding and debris flows. Eric Nicita, a soil scientist with the Eldorado National Forest, was surprised at the relatively high percentage of low soil burn severity, generally indicating more burning confined to the understory. The nearby Caldor Fire had experienced higher burn severities. The highest-intensity soil burn region was located in the drainage of the Rubicon River, between Foresthill and Volcanoville/Quintette.

Political 
On September 8, Governor of California Gavin Newsom declared a state of emergency for Placer and El Dorado counties. The following day, the Federal Emergency Management Agency (FEMA) granted the state's request for a Fire Management Assistance Grant (FMAG), which can provide federal funding for a large portion of eligible firefighting costs, including field camps, equipment, and mobilization/demobilization of personnel.

On September 22, California Insurance Commissioner Ricardo Lara announced an moratorium on the cancellation or non-renewal of residential insurance coverage in areas affected by the Mosquito Fire, in keeping with a policy he had first begun in 2019. The moratorium requires insurance companies to maintain residential insurance for one year after Newsom's September 8 emergency declaration for California policyholders living within the perimeter of the Mosquito Fire or in adjacent ZIP codes, totaling 18 ZIP codes in Placer and El Dorado counties. The September 22 announcement and moratorium also pertained to ZIP codes affected by or in proximity to the Fairview Fire in Southern California.

On November 19, Governor Newsom signed an executive order allowing some environmental regulations to be suspended, so as to expedite the removal of hazardous debris and speed other fire recovery actions.

Cause 
The cause of the Mosquito Fire has not officially been determined, and Cal Fire lists it as under investigation. However, media attention has circulated around a Pacific Gas and Electric Company (PG&E) incident report noting unspecified electrical activity close in time and location to the first report of the Mosquito Fire.

As of 2023, the company is cooperating with an investigation by the Forest Service and the Department of Justice into the cause of the blaze, and has been asked to produce documents and information for the probe. PG&E recorded a $100 million charge in Q3 2022 when it determined that it was likely it would incur a loss from the fire, though the investigation had not yet finished. Those who lost homes in the fire are able to submit claims to PG&E for compensation.

PG&E incident report 
On September 8, PG&E submitted an incident report to the California Public Utilities Commission (CPUC), indicating that "electrical activity occurred close in time to the report time of the fire", and that the U.S. Forest Service had placed caution tape around one of their 60-kilovolt overhead power transmission poles, on the Oxbow Tap/Middle Fork #1 line. PG&E qualified the report by saying that they had observed no damage or abnormal conditions to the transmission pole or other nearby facilities, nor had they observed down conductors in the area, or any vegetation on the line. In a September 8 interview, PG&E executive vice president Sumeet Singh said that the power line on the transmission pole tripped offline, in what was described as a fault, close to the fire's reported start time. Singh said the pole had been installed about a decade before, and inspected within 5 months of the Mosquito Fire, with no signs of damage. A preliminary inspection conducted after the fire started showed that the power line remained hung on the steel transmission pole, with no signs of contact with a tree. Singh said the company filed the report out of an abundance of caution, though in California utilities are required to submit reports related to any incident that is attributable or allegedly attributable to their facilities when they pass specific thresholds for impacts. PG&E's report mentions reported property damage as the reason for submission, and there had also been significant media coverage of the fire by that point.

Whether the electrical activity is connected to the Mosquito Fire's cause is unknown. However, PG&E equipment and practices have been found responsible for starting several major wildfires in Northern California. The 2021 Dixie Fire, California's largest non-complex wildfire, began in Butte County when a tree fell on a PG&E power line in the Feather River Canyon. The 2018 Camp Fire, California's deadliest wildfire, also began in the Feather River Canyon when hardware on a PG&E power line failed. PG&E and its hardware have also been implicated in the 2015 Butte Fire, the 2019 Kincade Fire, the 2020 Zogg Fire, and multiple others. The company filed for Chapter 11 bankruptcy in 2019 after amassing US$30 billion in liability for wildfires in the preceding years, emerging from bankruptcy in July 2020.

Civil lawsuits 
In late September, two separate civil lawsuits were filed against PG&E in the San Francisco Superior Court, both alleging that the fire was ignited by the company's utility infrastructure and that the company did not safely maintain/operate it. Both suits were filed on behalf of property owners affected by the wildfire. In a September 23 statement by email, PG&E said that Cal Fire and the U.S. Forest Service had not made a determination about the cause of the wildfire.

In December, the Placer County Water Agency filed a separate lawsuit, seeking damages from PG&E related to the Mosquito Fire (the agency claimed tens of millions of dollars lost in power sales) and providing a photo of the fire moments after it began, burning uphill underneath power lines. PG&E again noted there had been no official determination of the fire's cause.

In January 2023, El Dorado and Placer counties (with the El Dorado Water Agency, Georgetown Divide Public Utilities District and Georgetown Divide Fire Protection District as co-plaintiffs) filed a third suit against PG&E, again accusing the company of negligence and seeking to recoup costs from "fire suppression; law enforcement costs and overtime; administration, funding and operation of emergency operations and evacuation shelters; and lost tax revenue."

Forest Service criminal probe 
On September 26, PG&E filed a Form 8-K financial report announcing that (1) the U.S. Forest Service had indicated to them that the Mosquito Fire started in the area of the company's power line, (2) the Forest Service was conducting a criminal investigation into the Mosquito Fire, and (3) the Forest Service had removed and taken possession of one of PG&E's transmission poles and attached equipment on September 24. The company said elsewhere that it was cooperating with the Forest Service's investigation in addition to conducting its own.

Fire progression and containment

See also 

 Butte Fire (2015) – destructive wildfire in Amador and Calaveras counties, caused by a PG&E power line
 Dixie Fire (2021) – wildfire in the northern Sierra, largest of 2021 in California, caused by a tree falling on a PG&E power line
 Oak Fire (2022) – another destructive 2022 California wildfire, in Mariposa County

References

External links 

 CalFire Mosquito Fire incident page
 InciWeb Mosquito Fire incident page
 Live ArcGIS map of structure damage assessments in El Dorado County

2022 California wildfires
2022 meteorology
Wildfires in Placer County, California
Wildfires in El Dorado County, California
Tahoe National Forest
Eldorado National Forest
September 2022 events in the United States